Hârn is a folio written by N. Robin Crossby and published by Columbia Games in 1983. This first introduced the fantasy role-playing game setting of Hârn.

Contents
Hârn is the first product produced about Hârn, an island on the planet Kethira about three times the size of Great Britain. The contents include
 "Hârnview", a 32-page book containing a general overview the island's background, history, religion, economics and culture.
 "Hârndex": a 64-page encyclopedia containing indexed information about the island.
 a 22" x 34" colour map of the island
Hârn is a low-fantasy setting with a minimum of magic, broadly based on Norman England, with some fantasy elements provided by dwarves, elves and orcs.

A rules system was not included in this set — gamemasters were expected to adapt the Hârn campaign to an existing rules system of the time such as Advanced Dungeons & Dragons or RuneQuest. Later Hârn products would use a rules system called HârnMaster.

Publication history
Hârn Regional Module was written by N. Robin Crossby, who also drew the map. The set was enclosed in a folder and published by Columbia Games in 1983. A 2nd edition was published in 1985 as a boxed set.

Reception
In the September 1983 edition of Dragon (Issue 77), Roger E. Moore was impressed  by the enclosed map, calling it "beautiful. If you are a fan of fantasy cartography, the map makes a wonderful addition to one's collection." Due to the lack of ready-made adventures or adventure hooks, Moore recommended the game system for experienced gamemasters "who don't mind using a largely pre-fabricated universe", but warned "It is not a good idea to purchase Harn if you like to extensively alter game material unless you don't mind spending money." He concluded with a recommendation, saying, "Harn should be more than sufficient for mosy gaming needs [...] It could be better, but it is very good."

In the August 1984 edition of White Dwarf (Issue #56), Simon Farrell thought that Hârn "is a useful aid to almost any fantasy role-playing game," but he warned players that there was little information about non-human characters, the setting had very little magic, and statistics for non-player characters were not included. For those reasons, he gave it a below-average overall rating of 6 out of 10.

Reviews
Fantasy Gamer (Issue 4 - Feb 1984)

References

Hârn supplements
Role-playing game supplements introduced in 1983